The men's  high jump at the 2022 European Athletics Championships takes place at the Olympiastadion on 16 and 18 August.

Records

Schedule

Results

Qualification
Qualification: 2.28 m (Q) or best 12 performances (q)

Final

References

High jump M
High jump at the European Athletics Championships